The Loew's Jersey Theatre is a theater in Jersey City, New Jersey. Opened in 1929, it was one of the five Loew's Wonder Theatres, a series of flagship Loew's movie palaces in the New York City area. It was designed by the architectural firm of Rapp and Rapp in a Baroque/Rococo style. Tri-plexed in 1974, and then closed in 1986, it was dark for years. It was purchased by the city in 1993 and has been operated by a volunteer organization, the Friends of the Loews, since that time. The theater was designated as a New Jersey Registered Historic Site in 2009. In a move opposed by Friends of the Loews, the city in June 2014, agreed to let AEG Live operate the venue. After going to court, the lease by Friends of the Loews remains in effect. In February 2021 it was announced that the theater would undergo an $72 million restoration expected to begin in 2022.

History
The cost of construction in 1929 was $2 million. The capacity of the theatre on opening day was 3,021 patrons.

The theatre was added to the New Jersey Register of Historic Places on August 15, 1985. It also received a Determination of Eligibility from the National Register of Historic Places on October 17, 1985, but was not listed due to an objection by the owner.  It was subsequently listed on the National Register in 2022.

Closure 
The theatre closed in August 1986. The final film shown was Friday the 13th Part VI: Jason Lives. The Loew's Corporation sold the theatre to Hartz Mountain, who announced plans to demolish the theatre and build a new structure on the site.

Restoration 
Volunteers began restoration of the theatre once it had been acquired by the city of Jersey City, to prevent it from being demolished.

The Garden State Theatre Organ Society acquired a sister pipe organ to the missing Loew's Jersey pipe organ, originally installed at the Loew's Paradise theatre, and began the installation and restoration of the organ.

Programming 
The Loew's Jersey is a popular venue for film and photography shoots. The lobby of the Loew's Jersey was the disco in the film The Last Days of Disco and was featured in a 2007 Geico commercial featuring their gecko character.

In February 2011 the band The Strokes shot a music video for the single "Under Cover of Darkness" off of their 2011 album Angles at the Loew's Jersey Theatre, featuring the main lobby, promenade, and stage.

The theater is a popular venue for fundraising, corporate events, and weddings.

References

External links

Official Website of Loew's Jersey Theater
Loew's Jersey on the Cinema Treasures website
Wonder Organ

Buildings and structures in Jersey City, New Jersey
Cinemas and movie theaters in New Jersey
Culture of Jersey City, New Jersey
Event venues established in 1929
Loew's Theatres buildings and structures
Movie palaces
National Register of Historic Places in Hudson County, New Jersey
Theatres completed in 1929
Theatres in New Jersey
Tourist attractions in Jersey City, New Jersey